Días y Flores is the debut studio album by Cuban singer-songwriter Silvio Rodríguez, released in 1975.

Content
The album was censored in Francoist Spain. The track list was altered and the album was renamed to Te Doy una Canción. The songs Santiago de Chile and the title track Días y Flores were omitted and were replaced by Madre and Te Doy una Canción. With the end of the dictatorship, the two songs were added again, the new editions in Spain have thirteen songs.

Similarly, the album was also censored in Chile, due to the regime of Augusto Pinochet. A cassette titled Te Doy una Canción circulated, which did not contain the songs Santiago de Chile, Playa Girón, Como esperando abril and Pequeña Serenata Diurna, however it did includeTe Doy una Canción and a live version of Mariposas. There is also a CD like the Spanish version, which adds Madre after Santiago de Chile, and changes Días y flores for Te Doy una Canción.

Track listing

Personnel

Musicians 

 Silvio Rodríguez – guitar, vocals
 Emiliano Salvador – piano
 Frank Fernández – keyboards
 Eduardo Ramos – bass
 Pancho Amat – guitar, tres
 Pablo Menéndez – guitar, tres, electric guitar
 Daniel Aldama – percussion
 Ignacio Berroa – drums, percussion
 Leoginaldo Pimentel – drums, percussion
 Norberto Carrillo – percussion
 Luis Ballard – flute
 Orlando Valera – saxophone on Pequeña Serenata Diurna

Production 
 Jerzy Belc – engineer

References 

1975 albums
Silvio Rodríguez albums